Is That You? is the second album by Bill Frisell to be released on the Elektra Nonesuch label. It was released in 1990 and features performances by Frisell, keyboardist  Wayne Horvitz and drummer Joey Baron, who were all members of Naked City at this time.

Reception
The Allmusic review by Brian Olewnick awarded the album 3 stars, stating, "Is That You? finds the guitarist already trending away from that band's scattershot assault and toward the more pastoral leanings he would embrace in the upcoming decade".

Track listing
All compositions by Bill Frisell except as indicated.
 "No Man's Land" - 6:40
 "Someone in My Backyard" - 2:45
 "Rag" - 4:00
 "Is That You?" - 6:50
 "The Way Home" - 6:00
 "Twenty Years" - 2:43
 "Chain of Fools" (Covay) - 3:30
 "Hello Nellie" - 4:07
 "The Days of Wine and Roses" (Mancini, Mercer) - 3:35
 "Yuba City" (Horvitz)- 5:42
 "Half a Million" - 4:00
 "Hope and Fear" - 1:06

Personnel
Bill Frisell: electric and acoustic guitars, bass, banjo, ukulele, clarinet
Wayne Horvitz: keyboards, drum programming, momentary bass
Joey Baron: drums
Dave Hofstra: tuba on 4 & 8, bass on 7

References 

1990 albums
Bill Frisell albums
Nonesuch Records albums